Happy is a 1933 British musical film directed by Frederic Zelnik, starring Stanley Lupino, Dorothy Hyson, Laddie Cliff, and Will Fyffe. The plot concerns a band leader who pretends to be a millionaire in Paris.

Cast
 Stanley Lupino as Frank Brown
 Laddie Cliff as George  
 Will Fyffe as Simmy
 Dorothy Hyson as Lillian
 Harry Tate as Dupont
 Renee Gadd as Pauline
 Gus McNaughton as Waller
 Jimmy Godden as Brummelberg
 Bertha Belmore as Mrs. Brummelberg
 Hal Gordon as Conjuror
 Norma Varden as Miss Stone, Secretary with Glasses

Songs
Happy features the following songs:
 Happy and There's So Much I'm Wanting To Tell You by Stanley Lupino and Noel Gay
 There Was A Poor Musician and Will You Dance Through Life With Me, plus the musical score by Kurt Schwabach, Fred Raymond, Will Meisel, Ralph Stanley, Willy Rosen, Henrik N. Ege and Fred Schwarz.

Critical response
Hal Erickson gave the picture a generally favourable review in The New York Times, proclaiming it to be Too expensive for a "quota quickie" but not quite costly enough to qualify as an "A" picture, Happy is a shapeless but generally satisfying vehicle for several of England's top music-hall attractions.

References

External links

1933 films
British musical films
Films shot at British International Pictures Studios
Films directed by Frederic Zelnik
British black-and-white films
1933 musical films
1930s English-language films
1930s British films